KQQF (98.9 FM) is a radio station licensed to serve the community of Coffeyville, Kansas. The station is owned by SEK Media, LLC, and airs an Contemporary Christian format.

The station was assigned the call sign KQQF by the Federal Communications Commission on May 16, 1983. The station changed its call sign to KUSN on August 12, 1991, to KKRK on October 1, 1999, and back to KQQF on August 5, 2013.

In late July 2020, KQQF changed their format from adult contemporary to contemporary Christian, branded as "Sonshine 98.9".

References

External links
Official Website
FCC Public Inspection File for KQQF

QQF
Radio stations established in 1984
1984 establishments in Kansas
Montgomery County, Kansas
Contemporary Christian radio stations in the United States